What's My Name? is the ninth extended play by South Korean girl group T-ara. It was released on June 14, 2017, by MBK Entertainment and distributed by Interpark. The EP was released in six versions: a normal edition containing the group songs; an edition of each member with their solo songs; and a digital edition with all the songs, group and solo. A music video for the title track was also released on June 14. This is the first release since the departure of members Soyeon and Boram and the final release by T-ara under MBK Entertainment.

The EP was a commercial success peaking at number 4 on the Gaon Album Chart. The various versions of the EP have sold over 39,453 physical copies combined as of July 2017.

Background and release 
On March 6, 2017, MBK Entertainment revealed that the group would be making a comeback in early May with a new EP. A few days later, it was reported that the release would be the last as a six-member group, since the members' contracts would expire in May. On March 20, the agency revealed that a six-minute medley of the group's past singles would be included on the album, honoring their career as a six-member group. Later on, MBK updated that members Soyeon and Boram would not renew their contract, ad that the upcoming album would be their last. It was also confirmed that the group would not be disbanding.

On April 25, it was informed that the initial May 17 release was postponed to June 1, in order "to put the finishing touches to the new album". It was also revealed that, although members Soyeon and Boram's contracts would expire on May 15, they will be joining the promotions as scheduled. On May 6, MBK finally stated that "while settling the details on the comeback, we were unable to come to a satisfactory agreement with Boram and Soyeon, and their plans to join this album have fallen through", confirming that the group would return as a four-member group with members Qri, Eunjung, Hyomin and Jiyeon.

On May 16, it was reported that the group would be filming their music video Paju, Gyeonggi, South Korea, on May 17 for their new song. It was also revealed that the remaining members had re-recorded their new song for their June comeback. On May 29, through a V Live from the group's album photoshoot, the members set the release date to June 14. They also shared that they would be performing on M Countdown the next day and that the new song would be called "What's My Name?" and would be produced by Brave Brothers. On June 3, the group revealed that the new album would consist of seven songs, three group songs,a nd four solo songs. A Chinese version of the title track would also be included. On June 5, a music video was released, previously shown on the official fan club site.

The EP and the single were released on June 14, 2017, through several music portals, including MelOn, and iTunes, for the global market.

Promotion

Live performances 
The group also held a showcase on the same day for the album release.

The group held their first comeback stage on Mnet's M Countdown on June 15, performing their title track "What's My Name?". They continued on KBS's Music Bank on June 16, MBC's Show! Music Core on June 17, and SBS's Inkigayo on June 18.

The group won their first music show trophy in more than five years for their title track on June 20, on SBS MTV's The Show.

Commercial performance 
The EP debuted at number 2 on Hanteo's real-time chart while Jiyeon's version debuted at 3 selling +13,000 pure physical copies in the first hour of release.

Two versions of What's My Name? (Album) charted at Gaon Album Chart on the chart issue dated June 11–17, 2017, with the normal edition at number four and the Jiyeon version at number seven.

All versions of the EP entered at the Gaon Album Chart of June 2017: the normal edition at number 14 with 14,538 copies; Jiyeon's version at number 16 with 9,151 copies; Hyomin's version at number 22 with 5,000 copies; Qri's version on at number 25 with 4,796 copies; Eunjung's version at number 26 with 4,707.  For the month of July 2017: the normal edition sold 1,261 copies. The EP sold 39,453 physical copies combined alone in South Korea. In Japan, sales for all versions accumulated 522 copies, making the EP sales at 39,975 copies in total.

"What's My Name" debuted at number 79 on the Gaon Digital Chart on the chart issue dated June 11–17, 2017, with 25,716 downloads sold. It also appeared on multiple charts around the world including peaking at #1 on Chinese YinYueTai chart for 8 weeks.

Track listing

Accolades

Awards and nominations

Music show awards

Rankings

Release history

References

2017 EPs
Korean-language EPs
Dance-pop EPs
Interpark Music EPs
T-ara albums